Rhizosoleniophycidae or Rhizosoleniineae is a grouping of centric diatoms.

See also
Coscinodiscineae

References

SAR supergroup suborders

Coscinodiscophyceae